Cicadella is a genus of leafhoppers (family Cicadellidae), subfamily Cicadellinae and tribe Cicadellini.

Species
 Cicadella lasiocarpae Ossiannilsson, 1981
 Cicadella longivittata (O.G. Costa, 1834)
 Cicadella lunulata (O.G. Costa, 1834)
 Cicadella transversa (O.G. Costa, 1834)
 Cicadella viridis (Linnaeus, 1758) - Green Leafhopper

References
 H. Nickel - The leafhoppers and plant hoppers of Germany (Hemiptera, Auchenorrhyncha)

External links
 Fauna Europaea
 Biolib

Cicadellini
Cicadellidae genera
Taxa named by Pierre André Latreille